Francesco Lasca (born 29 March 1988) is an Italian former professional road bicycle racer, who rode professionally for UCI Professional Continental Team  between 2012 and 2015.

Career
Born in Osimo, Lasca competed as a professional from 2012, when he joined the  team after five seasons competing domestically for the Bedogni Natalini squad. He also won the second stage of the Volta a Portugal later in the year, beating  rider Reinardt Janse van Rensburg and 's Stéphane Poulhies in Trofa. Lasca remained with the team into 2013, taking a third place at the Clásica de Almería, before he became the first Italian winner of the Vuelta a La Rioja race in late March. He achieved his first stage race podium at the Vuelta a Castilla y León, where he finished third overall and was the winner of the points classification.

Major results

2006
 1st Stage 3 Giro di Basilicata
2007
 1st Trofeo Edilizia Mogetta
 2nd Memorial Gigi Pezzoni
 2nd GP Fratelli Bagnoli Trigonon
 2nd Gran Premio d'Apertura – Città di Pescara
 3rd GP Città di Vinci
2008
 1st Trofeo di Autunno
 2nd Trofeo Cibes
 2nd Firenze–Modena
 2nd Memorial Benfenati
 3rd Coppa Ciuffenna
 4th Medaglia d'Oro GS Budriese
 4th Coppa Penna
2009
 1st Coppa Penna
 1st Gran Premio d'Apertura
 3rd Trofeo Fosco Frasconi
 3rd Memorial Benfenati
 3rd Gran Premio della Liberazione
 3rd Gran Premio Artigiani e Commercianti
 3rd Trofeo delle Colline Capannoresi
 4th Trofeo Comune di Lamporecchio
 5th Memorial Gigi Pezzoni
 6th Trofeo Alvaro Bacci
 6th Pistoia–Fiorano
 6th Memorial Fratelli Gandolfi
 8th Trofeo Città di Montevarchi
2010
 2nd Trofeo Città di Montevarchi
 2nd GP Città di Vinci
 2nd Memorial Gigi Pezzoni
 2nd Trofeo Edilizia Mogetta
 3rd Coppa Loro Ciuffenna
 3rd GP Cuoio e Pelli
 3rd Gran Premio Sportivi Poggio alla Cavalla
 4th Trofeo Mario Zanchi
 6th Gran Premio San Giuseppe
 6th Firenze–Empoli
 9th Trofeo Colline Capannoresi
2011
 1st Gran Premio Vivaisti Cenaiesi
 1st Trofeo TV1
 1st Coppa Lanciotto Ballerini
 2nd Trofeo Gruppo Meccaniche Luciani
 3rd Coppa Collecchio
 3rd Gran Premio Sportivi Poggio alla Cavalla
 4th Coppa del Mobilio
 4th Trofeo Fosco Frasconi
 4th Trofeo Edilizia Mogetta
 5th Trofeo Alessio Pistolesi
 5th Gran Premio Pretola
 9th Trofeo Comune di Lamporecchio
2012
 1st Stage 2 Circuit de Lorraine
 1st Stage 2 Volta a Portugal
 4th Dwars door Drenthe
 7th Grand Prix de Fourmies
 8th Cholet-Pays de Loire
 10th Memorial Rik Van Steenbergen
2013
 1st Vuelta a La Rioja
 3rd Overall Vuelta a Castilla y León
1st  Points classification
 3rd Clásica de Almeria
2014
 2nd Vuelta a La Rioja

References

External links

Cycling Quotient profile

Italian male cyclists
1988 births
Living people
Sportspeople from the Province of Ancona
Cyclists from Marche